Fyrstadskretsen ('Four City Constituency') was a constituency for election to the Riksdag (Swedish parliament) between 1921 and 1991 - covering the municipalities of Malmö, Helsingborg, Landskrona and Lund. 

The constituency was set up ahead of the 1921 Swedish general election, under the name Malmö, Hälsingborgs, Landskrona och Lunds valkrets ('Electoral Constituency of Malmö, Hälsingborg, Landskrona och Lund'). At the time it was one of two constituencies in Malmöhus County. Prior to the 1921 elections, Malmö city had been a separate constituency whilst Helsingborg, Landskrona and Lund were part of the 'Three City Constituency' (Trestadskretsen).

References

Riksdag constituencies